Przemysław Zamojski (born 16 December 1986) is a Polish professional 3x3 basketball player as well as a retired basketball player.

Professional career
In July 2012, Zamojski signed with Trefl Sopot. He left them in December and returned to Prokom. In July 2013, he signed with Stelmet Zielona Góra. In January 2014, he signed a new one-and-a-half-year contract with Zielona Góra. He won a bronze medal with the Polish team at the 2019 FIBA 3x3 World Cup as well as 2021 FIBA 3x3 Europe Cup.

On June 25, 2021, he has announced his retirement from professional basketball in order to focus entirely on 3x3 basketball.

Polish national team
Zamojski played with the senior Polish national team at the EuroBasket 2013, the EuroBasket 2015, and the EuroBasket 2017.

References

External links
Euroleague.net Profile
Eurobasket.com Profile
PLK Profile

1986 births
Living people
3x3 basketball players at the 2020 Summer Olympics
Asseco Gdynia players
Basket Zielona Góra players
Independence Pirates men's basketball players
KK Włocławek players
Olympic 3x3 basketball players of Poland
People from Elbląg
Polish expatriate basketball people in the United States
Polish men's basketball players
Polish men's 3x3 basketball players
Shooting guards
Sportspeople from Warmian-Masurian Voivodeship
Trefl Sopot players